Debbie Belkin Rademacher (born May 27, 1966) is an American retired soccer defender who was a member of the United States women's national soccer team.

She was inducted into the National Jewish Sports Hall of Fame.

International career statistics

References

External links

1966 births
Living people
American women's soccer players
University of Massachusetts Amherst alumni
UMass Minutewomen soccer players
1991 FIFA Women's World Cup players
United States women's international soccer players
FIFA Women's World Cup-winning players
Jewish American sportspeople
Women's association football defenders
American soccer coaches
Michigan Wolverines women's soccer coaches
21st-century American Jews
21st-century American women